Fantail Falls is a waterfall in Mount Aspiring National Park, Westland District, New Zealand.  

Its name derives from the way it spreads out into the shape of a fan at its base, rather than any similarity to the tail of the native bird known as the fantail (pīwakawaka or Rhipidura fuliginosa).

For many years, beginning in the late 1930s, the waterfall had a hydroelectric power plant at its base, which provided power for roadwork machinery being used to construct a road from Makarora to Jackson Bay. The road was commissioned by the Ministry of Public Works and was the first road over the Haast Pass. It was not completed until 1960.

A 5-minute wheelchair-accessible bush walk leads to the riverbank opposite the waterfall from a carpark on State Highway 6. In addition, a steep  walk to the Brewster Hut, serviced by the Department of Conservation, starts at the base of the falls.

The walk to the falls passes through almost pure silver beech (Lophozonia menziesii) forest, as these falls are at a higher altitude than the other Haast Pass waterfalls, Roaring Billy Falls (80 m above sea level) and Thunder Creek Falls (110 m), which are set in mixed beech/podocarp forest. Underneath the beech canopy the forest floor is dominated by prickly shield fern (Polystichum vestitum), horopito (Pseudowintera colorata), and broadleaf (Griselinia littoralis).

See also
 List of waterfalls in New Zealand

References

External links

 Fantail Falls walk, Department of Conservation website
 Fantail Falls on the World of Waterfalls website

Waterfalls of New Zealand
Mount Aspiring National Park
Westland District
Landforms of the West Coast, New Zealand